Ema Klinec (born 2 July 1998) is a Slovenian ski jumper. In February 2021, she became the first Slovenian female ski jumping world champion after winning the normal hill event at the FIS Nordic World Ski Championships 2021.

Major tournament results

Winter Olympics

FIS Nordic World Ski Championships

World Cup record

Standings

Individual wins

Individual starts

References

External links

1998 births
Living people
Sportspeople from Kranj
Slovenian female ski jumpers
Ski jumpers at the 2016 Winter Youth Olympics
Ski jumpers at the 2018 Winter Olympics
Ski jumpers at the 2022 Winter Olympics
Olympic ski jumpers of Slovenia
Youth Olympic gold medalists for Slovenia
FIS Nordic World Ski Championships medalists in ski jumping
21st-century Slovenian women